is a railway station in the town of Nagiso, Nagano Prefecture, Japan, operated by Central Japan Railway Company (JR Tōkai).

Lines

Layout
The station has two opposed ground-level  side platforms connected by a footbridge. The station is unattended.

Platforms

Adjacent stations

|-
!colspan=5|

History
Jūnikane Station began as "Jūnikane Signal Stop" on 3 December 1929. It was elevated to a full passenger station on 1 September 1948.  On 1 April 1987, it became part of JR Tōkai.

Passenger statistics
In fiscal 2015, the station was used by an average of 20 passengers daily (boarding passengers only).

Surrounding area

See also

 List of Railway Stations in Japan

References

Railway stations in Japan opened in 1948
Railway stations in Nagano Prefecture
Stations of Central Japan Railway Company
Chūō Main Line
Nagiso, Nagano